The Unraveling (stylized as  THE UNRAVELING) is the third EP by Japanese heavy metal band Dir En Grey. It was released on April 3, 2013 as a single-CD Original Version, a deluxe Initial Limited Version digipak with bonus recording footage, and a Limited Order-Only Deluxe Version featuring the deluxe digipak with a bonus CD and extra DVD footage.

The bonus CD includes a remake of "Macabre" off the eponymous 2000 album and "The Final", with the latter and "Unraveling" as unplugged versions. The extra DVD footage also adds "Shot In One Take" versions of "Rinkaku" and "Kiri to Mayu", live performances from their performance on December 25, 2012 and an interview with sound engineer Tue Madsen.

Its packaging features art by artist and sculptor Yasuyuki Nishio. Except the title track, all remaining songs were rearranged and re-recorded from previous versions.

It debuted at #3 on the Oricon weekly chart.

Track listing

Touring 

After announcing The Unraveling on December 25, the band announced "TOUR2013 TABULA RASA" in promotion of the EP. The band went on to play Ozzfest Japan on May 12 and held a special extension of the tour for Japanese buyers of the limited deluxe version, titled "TABULA RASA -Sanagi no Yume wa Ageha no Hane-" at Shibuya Public Hall. 
In June, Dir En Grey performed at both Download Festival and Nova Rock.

Dir En Grey announced another split tour series in July, titled "GHOUL." The tour will first extend through Japan before extending to the United States and Canada in November.

References

External links 
 

2013 EPs
Dir En Grey EPs
Japanese-language EPs